is a Japanese manga series by Hiroshi Hiroyama (also known as KALMIA), serialized in Kadokawa Shoten's Comp Ace magazine from 2007 to 2008. It is an alternate universe spin-off of the Fate/stay night visual novel by Type-Moon, with Illyasviel von Einzbern as the protagonist. Various other characters from Fate/stay night and its sequels and spin-offs also appear. A second manga series titled  was serialized from 2009 to 2012. A third manga series titled  began serialization in 2012.

A 10-episode anime television series adaptation by Silver Link aired on Tokyo MX between July and September 2013. A second season, adapting the sequel manga, aired between July and September 2014. A third season titled Fate/kaleid liner Prisma Illya 2wei! Herz! began airing in July 2015. A fourth season titled Fate/kaleid liner Prisma Illya 3rei!! aired between July and September 2016. An animated film was released in 2017. An OVA titled Fate/kaleid liner Prisma Illya: Prisma Phantasm was released on June 14, 2019. A second film titled Fate/kaleid liner Prisma Illya: Licht - The Nameless Girl was released on August 27, 2021, and featured the same director, scriptwriter, character designer, and studio as the previous film.  A sequel has also been announced.

A video game adaptation titled , published by Kadokawa Games for the Nintendo 3DS, was released in Japan on July 31, 2014.

Plot
Illyasviel von Einzbern is an ordinary elementary school student who becomes a magical girl when the magical Kaleidostick Ruby deems her a more suitable master than the sorceress, Rin Tohsaka. Rin, who had been tasked by the wizard Zelretch to collect the seven Class Cards containing the spirits of Heroic Spirits from legend, finds that she is unable to change Ruby's mind and must supervise Illya in completing the task of collecting the Class Cards. During Illya's adventures, she receives a friend and rival in a girl named Miyu, the contracted master of the Kaleidostick Sapphire, which similarly abandoned its original master and Rin's rival, Luvia Edelfelt.

After a series of battles, Illya and Miyu were able to collect all Cards and became good friends, while Rin and Luvia remained in Japan by the order of Zelretch. However, the appearance of Kuro, a dark-skinned girl with a striking resemblance to Illya, soon complicates their lives as she attempts to eliminate Illya. Their battle is interrupted by the arrival of Illya's mother, Irisviel, who reveals that Kuro was originally intended to be the Holy Grail in the Holy Grail War, but after the war was prevented Kuro was sealed away so Illya could live a normal life. Illya supplies Kuro with the mana needed to sustain her physical form, and accepts her into the Einzbern family.

Shortly afterwards, the group is attacked by Bazett Fraga McRemitz, who was previously responsible for obtaining the Class Cards. A truce is forced when Rin reveals the existence of an eighth Class Card. The group confronts the eighth Class Card, Gilgamesh, who reveals that Miyu hails from a parallel world where she was born as a Holy Grail, before absorbing her. Illya combines the Kaleidostick Ruby and Sapphire to become Kaleido Liner Zwei, giving her the power to defeat Gilgamesh and save Miyu.

This victory is short-lived, as Miyu is kidnapped by the Ainsworth family and whisked away into the parallel world. Illya and her friends enter the parallel world and teams up with Tanaka, an amnesiac girl whose goal is to defeat the Ainsworths; Gilgamesh, who wishes to take back his Class Card from the Ainsworths following his defeat by Illya; and a parallel Shirou Emiya, Miyu's older brother who is imprisoned by the Ainsworths. The Ainsworths reveal that they intend to use Miyu as the Holy Grail to save their dying world, but Illya swears that she will find a way to save the parallel world without sacrificing Miyu. Following a confrontation, the Ainsworths escape and Gilgamesh leaves the group after reclaiming his Class Card, while Angelica Ainsworth reluctantly joins the group after being left to die by her family and Miyu and Shirou are liberated.

Characters

Main characters

In contrast with her Fate/stay night counterpart, Illya has had a normal childhood, growing up with no knowledge of magic or the Holy Grail War. She lives with her adored brother Shirou and is looked after by her maids Leysritt and Sella when her parents Kiritsugu and Irisviel are away. She is a fan of magical girl anime, and daydreams about becoming one. When she encounters a magic wand named "Magical Ruby", Illya is tricked into signing a contract and becoming a magical girl. She is also quite naive and carefree in comparison to her original version, even being ready to call herself, Miyu and Chloe as enamoured lesbians to hide their real activity as magical girls.

A Kaleidostick, a magical device that enables its user to become a magical girl. Though Ruby initially belongs to Rin, Rin's constant squabbling with Luvia causes Ruby to abandon Rin and contract herself to Illya instead. Sapphire calls her "nee-san". Ruby has a mischievous personality, and always teases Illya for her own amusement, as Illya's reactions always surpass her expectations.

A mysterious girl who is chosen by Sapphire to become her new master and then adopted by Luvia. She takes her duties as a Magical Girl very seriously and is initially dismissive of Illya's abilities, but gradually warms up to Illya, becoming admirative and highly protective of her.

A Kaleidostick, the younger sister of Magical Ruby, that enables Miyu to become a Magical Girl. Sapphire was originally assigned to Luvia, but, as with Ruby, Sapphire abandoned Luvia after becoming tired of her constant quarreling with Rin. She is the voice of reason of the duo, and is always serious about her job as a Kaleidostick.

 A young sorceress sent by the wizard Kischur Zelretch Schweinorg to Japan in order to capture the Class Cards using the powers of a Magical Girl. After Ruby abandons her for Illya, Rin forces Illya to accomplish her mission in her stead, all while guiding and supervising Illya. Though normally competent, her constant fighting with Luvia often causes them to create various embarrassing blunders, leaving Illya and Miyu with a negative opinion of their skills.

 A wealthy and proud young woman and sorceress assigned to work together with Rin to capture the Class Cards. After Sapphire abandons her, Luvia immediately adopts Sapphire's new master, Miyu, and guides her to capture the Class Cards. She is indiscriminate in using her wealth, erecting a mansion across the street from the Einzbern house in a single day, where she and Miyu are currently living. Her rivalry with Rin stems from both their naturally clashing personalities and their mutual crush on Shirou, who fails to notice their attraction to him.

 

 A mysterious girl who is identical to Illya, save for her dark skin, white hair and golden eyes, appears after Illya and Miyu capture all the Class Cards. She is an antagonistic presence and her initial goal is to destroy Illya for reasons unknown. Kuro's existence is later revealed to be another side of Illya that was previously sealed away so that Illya could live an ordinary life. In order to maintain existence, she must obtain mana from others by kissing them. After the "power struggle" in the Einzbern house, she is considered the "little sister" of Illya. Chloe is generous with her affections toward both Shirou and any girl she meets, especially Illya. Due to this, she often becomes the main source of yuri fanservice in the manga and the show.

Einzbern family

Illya's adoptive older brother, an ordinary young man who seems to often wind up in unfortunate situations. Illya and Chloe have a crush on him and he is rather popular with girls, including Rin, Luvia, Sakura Matō, Caren and Moriyama Nanami (Nanaki's older sister), though he fails to notice that they are openly attracted to him. Shirou tends to be treated poorly by the people around him, though he admits that he's gotten used to being at the bottom rung of the ladder. In essence, he is an open parody version of the original Shirou from Fate/stay night, whose features have been purposely raised to a comic level.
An alternate version of him, raised by Miyu's family, appears to have learned magecraft and is more similar in personality to the hotblooded Shirou in Fate/stay night and is currently shackled and imprisoned by the Ainsworth family, but later escaped after hearing that Miyu was in trouble and is assisting the girls in rescuing her.

 and 
 (Sella)
 (Leysritt)
Sella and Leysritt are maids in the Einzbern household and Illya and Shirou's primary caretakers. Sella is a woman who is easily irritated by the disturbances in the household, but is dedicated to Illya and takes her duties seriously. In contrast, Leysritt is easy-going and doesn't hesitate to shirk her duties and have Shirou do them instead. Nevertheless, she is very enthusiastic and sympathetic towards both Illya and Shirou. Sella has a tendency of thinking that Shirou is a lolicon and siscon, and beats him everytime he has his lucky pervert moments.

 and 
 (Irisviel)
 (Kiritsugu)
Illya and Shirou's parents, who are both often away from home and working hard to make sure their children can live ordinary lives. Irisviel is an eccentric woman who loves Illya and Shirou deeply and has enough skill to knock out Chloe with a single blow. In spite of being away, she and Illya share a close relationship. Though she is a descendant of a long line of magi, she and Kiritsugu left the Einzbern family shortly after Illya was born. Kiritsugu has yet to make a formal appearance in the series, though Shirou expresses the wish for him to return, mostly because he feels downtrodden by the overwhelming female presence in his household.
An alternate version of Kiritsugu appears in the alternate world through flashbacks as Miyu's and alternate Shirou's adoptive father, searching for the "Child of God" who could save their world, but is already dead in the present.

Homurahara Academy

Illya and Miyu's homeroom teacher at school.

A girl in Illya's circle of friends, who happens to be an honor student. She takes a liking to Boy's Love after watching the relationship of Illya-Miyu-Chloe and Shirou-Issei, and becomes a fujoshi after Suzuka and her sister introduce her to the realm of doujinshi. She has a little brother.

The heir to the only-men Ryuudou Temple, and best friends with Shirou Emiya. Like his Fate/stay Night counterpart, he is also a member of the student council.

A short girl with blonde hair in Illya's circle of friends. She is the most troublesome to the group, and an airhead. She constantly brings trouble to anything they do, like adding nutmeg and mints into pound cake in cooking class (she thought they are making hamburg steaks), even that her father says that she already helps much by not helping at all. Even though she is the heir to Gakumazawa-style dojo, she has no talents in martial arts at all.

A black-haired girl wearing red-frame spectacle who is in Illya's circle of friends. She is the rational mind of the group. She has an older sister, who is a doujin manga artist.

A pink-haired girl in Illya's circle of friends. She resents Luvia and Rin (who she calls 'blonde drills' and 'twintails' respectively) for stand in the way of her elder sister's love (her sister likes Shirou Emiya). She happens to be a genius, as she masters the Gakumazawa-style martial art in less than a few minutes  but her laziness prevents her from utilizing her talents efficiently.

The school nurse, a woman who has been observing Illya, Miyu and Chloe. She displays absolutely no interest in the events, and she is rather carefree about her job as a nurse. She is later revealed to be the Church's representative in the affair related to the Class Cards, working as background support as well as supervisor. It is also revealed that she chose to work as a school nurse as it allows her to indulge in her interest in observing the sufferings of children close up.

Class Cards

Gilgamesh is the eighth Class Card that was discovered by Rin after she investigated Fuyuki's Earth Pulses. Though he initially appears mindless and covered in a malignant black fog, he is fully capable of using his entire arsenal of weapons against his opponents. After defeating Bazett and Chloe, he escapes from the mirrored world of the Class Cards and completes a ritual allowing him to separate into two forms: a child version of himself and a gigantic black being that has access to most of Gilgamesh's noble phantasms and desires to win the Holy Grail War. Despite having no intention of winning, he allows himself to merge partly with the black being as he recognizes Illya is a worthy adversary after she combines both Kaleidosticks to become Kaleido Liner Zwei. He is ultimately defeated after a clash of strength between Illya's Kaleido Liner Zwei and his Enuma Elish.

Ainsworth family

The first head of the Ainsworth family 1000 years ago, Darius escaped death by possessing his descendants. During his first life after a bout of adventuring, he met Pandora, whereupon she told him a horrible truth of their world: it was slowly dying, with mana across the planet slowly but surely depleting and being replaced with something toxic to life. Shook by this revelation, Darius set out with Pandora to overcome this crisis using Pandora's Box, hoping to transform mankind into an existence that could survive the mana depletion.

Current head of the Ainsworth family and descendant of Darius. He first appears after Darius's spell on him is broken, and is a former classmate of Shirou.

Her real identity is Pandora, the first woman created by the Olympians. In this alternate universe, she never opened Pandora's box and thus became unable to die since her death was also contained inside the box, and eventually became unable to open it. Pandora was eventually found by Darius and has lived with the Ainsworth since then, taking various names over the generations, the most recent being Erika. 

She is Julian's childhood friend, knowing him since elementary school. After being rescued by Julian when she was being bullied by boys of their school because of her red hair, she fell in love with him and gained more self-confidence. At a certain point in time she died in front of him, by being trapped beneath scrap and debris. Her soul was then put into a Doll body.

Angelica was born in the Ainsworth family and the eldest sister of Julian. At the end of the Fourth Ainsworth Holy Grail War, she died and her soul was later put into a Doll.

Others

A First-Rank Combat Specialist: Sealing Designation Enforcer from the Magic's Association, sent to retrieve the Class Cards from Illya and Miyu, with force if necessary. She is skilled enough to overpower Rin, Luvia, and Chloe, and nearly defeats Illya and Miyu when they utilize the Class Cards against her. She is relentless with her mission, eventually forcing Rin to announce the existence of a previously unknown eighth Servant card to stop Bazett's assault and bring about a truce. Upon her retreat, Bazett returns the three cards she took from Illya.
Following the incident, she went bankrupt (due to Luvia making her pay the whole cost), and works many part-time jobs, notably as the employee of Gakumazawa and mascot "Lion Go-kun" at Gakugaku Animal Land.

Tatsuko's father. He is the only member in Gakumazawa family who has no blonde hair. He is the head of Gakumazawa Dojo, a fighting school that teaches the arts of countering (and nothing else). He loses easily, as seen when Luvia and Nanaki defeats him in two different occasions. He hires Bazett after the later went bankrupt following her assault on Edelfelt's mansion. After Nanaki defeated him and took the dojo plaque, he changes the dojo name from "嶽間沢" dojo to "GKMZW".

Tatsuko's mother, from whom her children inherited their blonde hair.

The first son of Gakumazawa family and Tatsuko's older brother with blonde hair. He seems like a cool-type person.

The second son of Gakumazawa family and Tatsuko's older brother with blonde hair. He seems like a high spirited type person, just like Tatsuko.

Nanaki's older sister. According to Nanaki, she is "a very kind and good natured person. F-cup." She has a crush on Shirou Emiya. Despite being very kind, she apparently is bold enough to use her innocent act in seducing Shirou, as she asks him to wipe down her body when she is having a fever. Her way of seducing Shirou makes Rin and Luvia dislikes her, and after they throw a bag of dissection frogs at her, Nanami develops a phobia of frogs, which Nanaki notes as sad because her name "巳" means "snake".

Suzuka's older sister, and a doujin manga artist. She always forces Suzuka to do her bidding, especially helping her in drawing doujin manga when the deadline is near. She is also a fujoshi.

Luvia's butler, and very loyal to her. He has high combat capabilities. He acts like an overprotective father towards Shirou, who Luvia has a crush on.

An amnesiac woman found by Illya after coming to the alternate world. She tends to forget a lot of things except for her name. However she is upbeat, cheerful, she is also considered the comic relief when she's not serious. She tends to sleep when she doesn't understand what people are trying to explain. Tanaka has the mind of a child, as stated by Illya. For some reason, Tanaka likes to wear gym clothes instead of wearing regular clothes and doesn't like Erika Ainsworth. However, during crucial moments, she will go into a trance and perform feats that cannot be classified as human such as regenerating.

An alternate version of Kirei Kotomine from Fate/stay night, in this world he is a shell of his former self that is simply observing to witness the end of the world. He notably found a meaning to his life by owning a Ramen shop that only makes and serves mapo tofu.

Media

Manga
The series, written by Hiroshi Hiroyama, began serialization in Kadokawa Shoten's Comp Ace magazine from September 2007. A sequel series titled  was serialized from 2009 to 2012. A third manga series titled  began serialization in 2012. In 2010, a special chapter was serialized in Comp Ace to celebrate the magazine's fifth anniversary, featuring a crossover between Prisma Illya and Magical Girl Lyrical Nanoha.

Anime

The first season, a 10-episode anime television series adaptation by Silver Link, aired in Japan between July 13 and September 14, 2013. The series was simulcast by Crunchyroll. Episodes were streamed a week prior on Niconico. The opening theme is "Starlog" by ChouCho whilst the ending theme is "Prism Sympathy" by StylipS. The anime is licensed in North America by Sentai Filmworks, who released the series on Blu-ray Disc and DVD on September 2, 2014.

The second season, Fate/Kaleid liner Prisma Illya 2wei!, aired between July 10 and September 11, 2014. The opening theme is "Moving Soul" by Minami Kuribayashi whilst the ending theme is "Two By Two" by Yumeha Kouda.

The third season, Fate/kaleid liner Prisma Illya 2wei Herz!, aired in 2015 between July 25 and September 26. The opening theme is "Wonder Stella (ワンダーステラ)" by fhána whilst the ending theme is "Happening☆diary (ハプニング☆ダイアリー)" by Yumeha Kouda (Episode 1-5) then "Wishing Diary" (Episode 6-10), also performed by Yumeha Kouda.

The fourth season, Fate/Kaleid liner Prisma Illya 3rei!!, aired between July 6, 2016 and September 21, 2016. The role of Sapphire was recast following the death of voice actress Miyu Matsuki on October 27, 2015. Yumi Kakazu was announced as the new voice of Sapphire. The opening theme is "Asterism" by ChouCho, whilst the ending theme is "WHIMSICAL WAYWARD WISH" by TECHNOBOYS PULCRAFT GREEN-FUND feat. Yumeha Kouda. The ending theme for episode nine was "Cuddle" by ChouCho.

Films 

An animated film based on the series, Fate/kaleid liner Prisma Illya: Vow in the Snow, was released on August 26, 2017. Ōnuma and Silver Link returned from the anime series to direct and produce the film, respectively. A second film adaptation of the series was announced on May 21, 2020.  The film, titled Fate/kaleid liner Prisma Illya: Licht - The Nameless Girl, premiered on August 27, 2021.  After the film's premiere, it was announced that the series would be receiving a sequel.

OVA
An original video animation (OVA) episode was announced on December 22, 2018. Titled Fate/kaleid liner Prisma Illya: Prisma Phantasm, the OVA was screened in Japanese theaters on June 14, 2019. The main staff and cast reprised their roles.

Video game
A video game adaptation developed and published by Kadokawa Games for the Nintendo 3DS titled  has been released in Japan on July 31, 2014 with both regular and limited editions. The game covers the story from the manga and the anime series.

References

External links
Official website 

Anime series based on manga
Anime spin-offs
Bandai Namco franchises
Fate/stay night anime
Fate/stay night manga
Kadokawa Dwango franchises
Kadokawa Shoten manga
Magical girl anime and manga
Post-apocalyptic fiction
Seinen manga
Sentai Filmworks
Silver Link
Medialink